William John Miklich (April 3, 1919 – March 10, 2005) was an American football center and linebacker in the National Football League for the New York Giants and the Detroit Lions.  He played college football at the University of Idaho. He was a World War II veteran of the U.S. Marines.

Early life 

Miklich attended West Allis High School in West Allis, Wisconsin where he was named All-Conference in 1938. He also played quarterback and punter, and his coach Neil Gonyo described Miklich as the greatest fullback he ever coached at West Allis. He became the starting fullback and linebacker for the University of Idaho.

References

External links
    

1919 births
2005 deaths
People from Greenwood, Wisconsin
Sportspeople from Waukesha, Wisconsin
New York Giants players
Detroit Lions players
Idaho Vandals football players
Players of American football from Wisconsin
Sportspeople from the Milwaukee metropolitan area
Military personnel from Wisconsin
United States Marine Corps personnel of World War II
Burials in Wisconsin